Marina Mechislavovna Shimanskaya (born October 27, 1955) is a Russian actress, pedagogue and theater teacher.

In her professional career there are more than twenty major performances in the most popular theaters such as Sovremennik Theatre, Hermitage Theatre or Chiot Nechet, more than fifteen films and several television series, such as Goenkale (EITB Media) or The Crown (Netflix).

She has developed her teaching work in various European Drama schools (colleges, universities and free-standing institutions), distinguishing herself for the development of the Stanislavski's system and the Russian method acting (the Stanislavsky - Chekhov - Grotowski - Vajtangov method).

Early life and family
Marina Shimanskaya was born on October 27, 1955 in the town of Saratov (Soviet Union, at that time), on the banks of the Volga in Russia.

Her father is Mechislav Iosifovich Shimansky, a descendant of Polish aristocrats who owned a family property near Zhitomir (Ukraine). His parents (Marina's grandfather and grandmother), as well as his older brother, Leonid Iosifovich Shimansky (Marina's uncle), were shot.

Mechislav Iosifovich Shimansky was imprisoned in the Saratov forced labor camp accused of being an "enemy of the regime" of the USSR because his mother was of German origin and descendants of Polish aristocrats. Her mother was a nurse at the Saratov prison hospital and it was there that they met. Marina was born in a settlement (camp) in "bunkhouses with long corridors and tiny rooms".

In 1981 Marina met the Russian-Spanish actor and director Algis Arlauskas during the filming of the movie "Taking care of women", with whom he married and had two children, Olga Arlauskas (Russian director) in 1981, a Russian film director, and Alejandro in 1990, divorcing in 2016.

Since 1992 Shimanskaya has been working in Europe. She is an actress, stage director and Dramatic Art teacher with extensive and proven experience. She learned Spanish to be able to read Lorca's works, and she is a faithful follower of all his work.

Nowadays she lives in Bilbao (Spain).

Education

At the age of 18 he moved to Moscow. She managed to enter the State Institute of Theater Arts of Russia and got a scholarship to study drama at the Russian Institute of Theatre Arts – GITIS, where she graduated. There she had as teachers the students of Konstantin Stanislavski and Michael Chekhov.

She was student of Oleg Tabakov.

Career

1973–1992: Early work

Marina Shimanskaya's debut in the cinema took place in 1977 playing Lydia Nikolaevna in the film "When I become a giant" (Когда я стану великаном). Already after the first roles in the film, in 1981, she appeared on the cover of Soviet Screen magazine. She received great fame after the premiere of the movie "Caring for Women" (Берегите женщин) in 1981.

Marina Shimanskaya worked in the best companies in Russia, starred in more than fifteen feature films, a score of theatrical works, ... In addition to touring Europe and the United States.

She worked at the Hermitage Theater in Moscow between 1984 and 1991. In the 1991–1992 season he expanded his training under the direction of Oleg Tabakov.

1992–present

Since 1992 Shimanskaya works in Europe. She is an actress, stage director, and drama teacher. In 2009, together with her husband the actor and director Algis Arlauskas, she founded the drama school Ánima Eskola School of Drama where she teaches. In addition, she has taught acting classes at the University of Zaragoza and the University of Navarra, among others.
 
Shimanskaya is an expert in the Stanislavski's system and Russian method and she has studied and developed it, under the Stanislavsky, Mikhail Chekhov, Grotowski and Vajtangov method (Russian method), following the methodologies of the Russian school.

In 2010 she received the Ercilla Award for Best Theatrical Career.

In the year 2022 she played the role of Naina Yeltsina, First Lady of Russia, in the acclaimed TV series The Crown (Netflix).

Filmography

Television

Film

Stage 

 Hello, Monsieur de Maupassant (Здравствуйте, господин де Мопассан)
 Straw Hat (Соломенная шляпка)"
 Chizh and hedgehog (Чиж и еж)
 So far everything is about kay (Пока все о кей)
 The Beggar, or the Death of Zand (Нищий, или Смерть Занда)

Awards 

 2010, Ercilla Award for Best Theatrical Career.

References

External links 

1955 births
Living people
Actors from Saratov
Soviet film actresses
Russian film actresses
Russian Academy of Theatre Arts alumni
Russian emigrants to Spain
Drama teachers
Stage actresses
Russian stage actresses